Marechal Thaumaturgo (English: Marshal Thaumaturgo) is a municipality located in the west of the Brazilian state of Acre. Its population is 19,299 and its area is 7,744 km².

The municipality contains 5% of the  Serra do Divisor National Park, created in 1989.

It contains most of the Alto Juruá Extractive Reserve, created in 1990, and 5% of the Alto Tarauacá Extractive Reserve, created in 2000.

Climate

References

Municipalities in Acre (state)